Dykeman Waldron Baily (July 1, 1871 - 1953) was a businessman and author. His novel The Heart of the Blue Ridge was adapted into a silent film. Baily established Baily Manufacturing Company, a locust wood pin and cross arm manufacturing business in Elkin, North Carolina. He also owned the Baily Chair Company. Many of his books are set in North Carolina locations including Bogue Banks, North Carolina's Piedmont region and Wilkes County, North Carolina.

Baily was born in Mount Kisco, New York. He served as mayor of Elkin.

Bibliography
Heart of the Blue Ridge, W.J. Watt and Co., New York City (1915), illustrated by Douglas Duer
The Homeward Trail (1916), illustrated by George William Gage
When the Cock Crows, Bedford Publishing Co., New York City (1918), illustrated by George W. Gage
June Gold, W. J. Watt and Co., New York City (1922), frontispiece by Paul Stahr
Autobiography; the Life of the Novelist and Politician from North Carolina (1958)

References

External links
 
 June Gold online at East Carolina University

1871 births
1953 deaths
20th-century American novelists
Novelists from North Carolina